The Chugpa are one of the few smaller tribes of Arunachal Pradesh, living in the West Kameng district around Dirang. They are a tribe of the Monpa.

Like other Monpa, they are also adherents of Tibetan Buddhism. However, like the Lishipa, they are considered just as inferior to the Monpa as both groups are descended from the early waves of immigrants from Tibet via Bhutan or from Tibet. Like most Buddhist tribes, they built houses based on stones and follow a Tibetan Buddhist culture, though they might not be as advanced as the Monpa. Their language belongs to the Tibeto-Burman group.

References 

 North East Zone Cultural Centre (Used as information reference to all related articles on tribal groups of Arunachal Pradesh)
Sumi Krishna. Gender Dimensions in Biodiversity Management : India. Report submitted to FAO Regional Office for Asia and the Pacific, Bangkok, Thailand. June 1997.

Tribes of Arunachal Pradesh
Buddhist communities of India